CFNM-FM is a community radio station that broadcasts at 99.9 FM in Nemaska, Quebec, Canada.

The station is owned and administrated by the Cree Nation of Nemaska.

External links
www.creeradio.com

Fnm
Fnm
Fnm
Year of establishment missing